Richard Roberts may refer to:
 Richard Roberts (engineer) (1789–1864), British engineer
 Richard Roberts (sea captain) (1803–1841), Irish captain of the SS President
 Richard Roberts (Australian politician) (1835–1903), New South Wales politician
 Richard Roberts (theologian) (1874-1945), British/Canadian theologian and pacifist
 Richard Roberts (priest) (1884–1970), Anglican Archdeacon of St Asaph
 Richard Howell Roberts (1916–1986), Canadian Surgeon General
 Richard Roberts (footballer), English footballer in the 1940s
 Richard Roberts (soccer), American soccer forward in the 1940s and 1950s
 Richie Roberts (born 1937), former New Jersey police detective and defense attorney
 Sir Richard J. Roberts (born 1943), British biochemist and Nobel laureate
 Richard Roberts (evangelist) (born 1948), American charismatic televangelist
 Richard Roberts (geoscientist) (also known as Bert), Australian geoscientist and archaeologist, director of ARC Centre of Australian Biodiversity and Heritage (CABAH)
 Richard W. Roberts (born 1953), American judge
 Richard Roberts (pharmaceutical executive) (born 1957), American pharmaceutical executive
 Richard Owain Roberts (born 1982), Welsh author
 Richard Roberts, musician in Chi-Pig

See also
 Rick Roberts (disambiguation)
 Dick Roberts (disambiguation)